Lat-e Disar (also Romanized as Lāt-e Dīsar) is a village in Sakht Sar Rural District, in the Central District of Ramsar County, Mazandaran Province, Iran. At the 2006 census, its population was 30, in 10 families.

References 

Populated places in Ramsar County